Soleil Falcones (Buenos Aires, May 7, 1983), better known as Soleil, is an Argentine singer, songwriter and disc jockey. Her single "Pa' la calle" (2019) reached number 31 on Billboard Latin Pop Airplay chart and "No me arrepiento" (2018), a collaboration with Dominican artist Maffio, reached number 29 on the same chart.

Biography 
Soleil was born in Buenos Aires, Argentina on May 7, 1983. After receiving her academic training at the Catholic University and the University of Belgrano, she decided to move to Miami, Florida to begin a career as a singer. Initially she had to perform several jobs before becoming a Disc jockey. After moving to New York City, she met manager Johnny Falcones -known for his work with artists such as La India, Celia Cruz and Marc Anthony- with whom she began a romantic relationship. With Falcones help, Soleil released "Despertaré", a song that featured a remix in a salsa with the collaboration of the Puerto Rican singer Tito Rojas.

At the beginning of 2018 she released her second single with the collaboration of Dominican artist Maffio, titled "No me arrepiento", with a video clip starred by Puerto Rican actor Luis Guzmán. On March 23, the song climbed to number 29 on the Billboard Latin Pop Airplay chart, where it remained for eleven consecutive weeks. That same year she embarked on her first United States tour, visiting some cities like Boston, Miami and Washington D.C., as well as performing in countries such as Puerto Rico, Venezuela, Colombia, Argentina, Ecuador and Dominican Republic.

After the release of her first full-length album, entitled Domino Effect, on July 12, 2019 her single "Pa' la calle" reached number 31 on the Latin Pop Airplay chart, where it remained for nine weeks. That same year she participated in the Calibash Las Vegas event at the T-Mobile Arena, where she shared the stage with Maffio. In 2020 Soleil recorded "La vida es un carnaval", a cover of the popular song by Cuban artist Celia Cruz.

Discography

Albums

Singles

References

External links 
 

1983 births
21st-century Argentine women singers
Argentine composers
Living people
Argentine DJs
Argentine women composers